Drinkwater & Schriver Mill, also known as Cedar Point Mill, was listed on the National Register of Historic Places (NRHP) in 2006. It is located in Cedar Point, Kansas, United States.

History
In 1867, a log dam was built across the Cottonwood River, and a wooden-frame mill was constructed for sawing lumber.  The following year (1868) it was converted to grind flour and named Cedar Point Mill.

In 1870, the name was changed to Drinkwater & Schriver Mill.  In 1871, construction of the current stone structure was started.  In 1875, the building was completed. It used stone burrs to grind corn and wheat into flour, with a capacity of 75 barrels per day.  In 1884, the log dam was replaced by a stone dam.

See also
 National Register of Historic Places listings in Chase County, Kansas

References

Further reading

 History  of  the  Mill  at  Cedar  Point, Kansas; Harvey E. Brunner; Chase County Historical Society; Date Unknown.
 Chase County Leader (newspaper): July 14, 1871; Sep 22, 1871; June 10, 1875; Dec 23, 1875.
 Chase County Historical Sketches: Vol I; Chase County Historical Society, 1940.
 Chase County Historical Sketches: Vol II; Chase County Historical Society, 1949.
 Chase County Centennial 1872-1972; 1972.

External links
Official
 

National Park Service (NPS)
 
 

Kansas Historical Society (KHS)
 Orlo H. Drinkwater biography
 Photos from 1900 to 1920. (1), (2), (3)
 Photos from 1957. (4), (5)

Articles
 Drinkwater & Schriver Flour Mill; kansastravel.org
 Cedar Point Mill restoration in progress; Nov 28, 2015; Emporia Gazette
 Freight House mastermind Dan Clothier sets his sights on reviving a Kansas grain mill; Dec 19, 2015; Kansas City Star

Library buildings completed in 1875